Menas, a male personal name, could refer to:

People 

 Menas, one of the seventeen representatives for Sparta to swear an oath for the Peace of Nicias
 Menas or Minas of Aksum, Ethiopian bishop (6th century)
 Menas of Ethiopia, Emperor of Ethiopia (1559–1563)
 Menas (freedman), a Roman admiral who served under Sextus Pompeius
 Saint Menas (disambiguation)

Other 
 A pirate in William Shakespeare's Antony and Cleopatra, based on the historical admiral
 Menas, Niger national football team nickname
 Menas or Meenas, a tribe of India

See also 

 Mena (disambiguation)
 Menes (disambiguation)
 Mina (disambiguation)
 Saint Menas (disambiguation)